The War of the Fifth Coalition was a European conflict in 1809 that was part of the Napoleonic Wars and the Coalition Wars.  The main conflict took place in central Europe between the Austrian Empire of Francis I and Napoleon's French Empire. The French were supported by their client states, including the Kingdom of Italy, the Confederation of the Rhine and the Duchy of Warsaw. Austria was supported by the Fifth Coalition which included the United Kingdom, Portugal, Spain, and the Kingdoms of Sardinia and Sicily, though the latter two took no part in the fighting. By the start of 1809 much of the French army was committed to the Peninsular War against Britain, Spain and Portugal. After France withdrew 108,000 soldiers from Germany, Austria attacked France to seek the recovery of territories lost in the 1803–1806 War of the Third Coalition.  The Austrians hoped Prussia would support them as their former ally, but Prussia chose to remain neutral.

On 10 April 1809 Austrian forces under Archduke Charles crossed the border of Bavaria, a French client state. The French response, under Louis-Alexandre Berthier, was disorganised but order was imposed with the arrival of Napoleon on 17 April. Napoleon led an advance to Landshut, hoping to cut off the Austrian line of retreat and sweep into their rear.  Charles crossed the Danube at Regensburg, which allowed him to retreat eastwards, though he failed to reach the Austrian capital, Vienna, before the French. A French assault across the Danube was repulsed on 21–22 May at the Battle of Aspern-Essling but a repeat attack was successful in July. Napoleon won a major victory at the 5–6 July Battle of Wagram, which forced the Austrians to sign the Armistice of Znaim on 12 July. Austrian invasions of the Duchy of Warsaw and Saxony (where they fought alongside the Black Brunswickers) were repulsed and they were driven out of their territories in Italy. British forces landed in Walcheren, in the French client state of Holland, but were unable to seize their objective of capturing Antwerp and were later withdrawn.

The war ended with the Treaty of Schönbrunn, which was regarded as harsh towards Austria as she lost her Mediterranean ports and 20% of her population. Despite the eventual French victory, their defeat at Aspern-Essling showed that Napoleon could be defeated on the battlefield. The war led to the Tyrolean Rebellion, the 1809 Gottscheer rebellion and rebellions in Italy which, although suppressed, foreshadowed future nationalist and anti-French risings. After Schönbrunn, Austria became a French ally and this was cemented by the marriage of Napoleon to the Austrian princess Marie Louise.

Background
In 1809, Europe was embroiled in warfare, pitting revolutionary France against a series of coalitions in the Coalition Wars almost continuously since 1792. A brief period of peace followed the March 1802 Treaty of Amiens before British-French relations deteriorated, leading to the War of the Third Coalition in May 1803. Britain was joined in their coalition by Sweden in 1804 and Russia and Austria in 1805. In August 1805, the 200,000-strong French Grande Armée invaded the German states, hoping to defeat Austria before Russian forces could intervene. The French emperor Napoleon successfully wheeled his army into the Austrian rear and defeated them at the Battle of Ulm, fought from 15 to 20 October. The Austrian capital, Vienna, was captured in November and a Russo-Austrian army was decisively defeated at the 2 December Battle of Austerlitz. The Treaty of Pressburg, signed soon afterwards, ended Austrian participation in the war. 

Austerlitz incited a major shift in the European balance of power. Prussia felt threatened in the region and, alongside Russia, declared war against France in the 1806 War of the Fourth Coalition. After French victories at the Battle of Jena and the Battle of Auerstadt on 14 October, France occupied the Prussian capital, Berlin. France invaded Poland in November, where Russian forces were stationed, and occupied Warsaw. Russian and French armies fought in February 1807 at the violent, indecisive Battle of Eylau. The action in Poland culminated on 14 June 1807 when the French defeated Russia at the Battle of Friedland. The resulting Treaty of Tilsit in July left France as the dominant power in Western Europe, with many client states including the Duchy of Warsaw. This weakened Prussia and allowed Russia to expand into Finland and South-Eastern Europe.

Peninsular War 

In 1807 France tried to force Portugal to join the Continental System, a commercial embargo against Britain.  When the Portuguese Prince Regent, John refused to join, Napoleon sent General Junot to invade Portugal in 1807, resulting in the six year Peninsular War.  The war weakened the French Empire's military, particularly after Spanish forces and civilians rebelled against France after Napoleon overthrew the Spanish king. After the French defeat at the Battle of Bailén, Napoleon took command of the French forces, defeating the Spanish armies before returning to France. Jean-de-Dieu Soult drove the British out of Spain in the Battle of Corunna in January 1809.

In the beginning of 1809, the French client kingdom of Spain, ruled by Napoleon's brother Joseph Bonaparte, controlled much of Spain and northern Portugal. British and Portuguese forces under Arthur Wellesley launched new offensives from Spring 1809. Spanish regular armies including those led by generals Miguel Ricardo de Álava and Joaquín Blake continued to fight and guerrilla activity in the countryside made French operations hazardous.  A significant French presence, numbering 250,000 in June 1809, remained in the peninsula throughout the War of the Fifth Coalition.

The Napoleonic occupation of France's own ally Spain persuaded many in Austria that Napoleon could not be trusted and declaring war was the only way to prevent him from destroying the Habsburg monarchy. The Spanish guerrillas inspired popular resistance against Napoleon, and the Austrians hoped that French preoccupation in Spain would make it easier to defeat France.

Austria plans for war 

After Austria was defeated in 1805, the nation spent three years reforming its army. Encouraged by the events in Spain, Austria sought another confrontation with France to avenge their defeats and regain lost territory and power. Austria lacked allies in central Europe; Russia, her main ally in 1805, made peace with Napoleon at Tilsit and was engaged in wars with erstwhile allies like Britain in the Anglo-Russian War (1807–12), Sweden in the Finnish War and the Ottoman Empire in the Russo-Turkish War (1806–1812). France tried to reinforce their relationship with Russia through the September–October 1808 Congress of Erfurt. Under the treaty Russia agreed to support France if it was attacked by Austria.  In early 1809, Austrian minister Johann Philipp Stadion secured Russian Tsar Alexander I's agreement that the Russians would move slowly and "avoid every collision and every act of hostility" during any advance into Austria. At the same time, the French minister Charles Maurice de Talleyrand-Périgord secretly advised Alexander to resist France. During the War of the Fifth Coalition, Russia remained neutral even though they were allied to France.

Austria hoped Prussia would assist them in a war with France but a letter from Prussian minister Baron von Stein discussing the negotiations was intercepted by French agents and published in the Le Moniteur Universel on 8 September. Napoleon confiscated Stein's holdings in Westphalia and pressured Frederick into dismissing him, and Stein fled into exile in Austria.  On the same day that Stein was compromised the Convention of Paris agreed a timetable for the withdrawal of foreign troops from Prussia, where French garrisons had been in place since the end of the War of the Fourth Coalition.  The withdrawal was contingent on the payment of heavy reparations, totalling 140 million francs, over 30 months.  The Prussian army was also limited in size to 42,000 men, one sixth of its pre-war total.  The convention severely restricted the ability of the Prussian state to wage war.   Despite this setback Stadion hoped Prussia would change their mind and that an Austrian advance into the French-controlled Confederation of the Rhine in Germany would lead to popular uprisings that would distract the French.

France withdrew 108,000 troops from Germany, more than half their strength there, to reinforce the French armies in Spain in October 1808. This lent support to Stadion's pro-war faction at the Austrian court.  Stadion recalled Klemens von Metternich, his ambassador to Paris, to convince others to support his plan and by December 1808 Emperor Francis I was persuaded to support the war.  Francis' support was tentative and the decision to proceed was made at an 8 February 1809 meeting that included the emperor, Archduke Charles and Stadion. The empire's poor financial situation (it could only afford to maintain its army on home soil until late Spring) lent urgency to the decision. Charles disputed the prospects for success but accepted Francis' decision to prepare for war and the army was mobilised.

Austria and Prussia requested that Britain fund their military campaigns and requested a British military expedition to Germany. In April 1809 the British treasury supplied £20,000 in credit to Prussia, with additional funds promised if Prussia opened hostilities with France. Austria received £250,000 in silver, with a further £1 million promised for future expenses. Britain refused to land troops in Germany but promised an expedition to the low countries and to renew their campaign in Spain. After Prussia decided against war, the Fifth Coalition formally consisted of Austria, Britain, Portugal, Spain, Sicily and Sardinia, though Austria was the majority of the fighting effort.

Austrian army and strategy 
Austria built the largest army in its nation's history, though its fighting quality was hampered by numerous factors.  The men were conscripted from across the Austrian Empire and included Austrians, Hungarians, Czechs, Poles, Croats and Serbs; some, including the Hungarians, did not enthusiastically support their Austrian rulers.  Conscription focussed on the lower classes of society and the private soldiers, most of the non-commissioned officers, and many junior officers were illiterate.  The army was well drilled in massed column formations which were effective against cavalry but vulnerable to artillery fire, which hampered it in some battles of the campaign.  The regular infantry were thought too slow-witted to be trained in skirmishing; this role had traditionally been filled by grenzer light infantry units, but their quality declined since the potential conflicts with the Ottoman Empire ended.  The deficiency was only partly remedied by recently created volunteer jäger units.  

The Austrian militia, the Landwehr, were intended as a home defence force but were moved to serve with the field army.  The force was equipped with second rate weapons, were poorly trained, and forbidden to accept officers from the landowning classes, leading to poor leadership.  They were used later in the war as cannon fodder to divert French fire.  The Austrian cavalry was of reasonably good quality, though in 1809 it was hampered by large numbers of its horses being only partly trained.  The artillery was not as dynamic as in some contemporary armies, being placed under infantry commanders in the field and lacking proper horse artillery to manoeuvre quickly.  The Austrian army was supposed to be supplied by a large wagon train, which restricted its manoeuvrability.  Its senior officers were appointed based on aristocratic backgrounds and seniority, rather than ability; this led to elderly generals – the average being 63.  The field commander, Archduke Charles, was unable to dismiss any of his commanders.  He favoured doctrine over flexibility and expected his generals to follow a guide he had published in 1806.   

Charles and the Aulic Council were divided on the best strategy for the coming war, Charles favoured an offensive launched from Bohemia where there was a concentration of Austrian forces and an attack could quickly isolate the French in northern Germany. The Aulic Council disagreed because the Danube River would split the forces of Charles and his brother Archduke Johann of Austria. They suggested that the main attack should be launched south of the Danube to maintain safer communications with Vienna. In the end the Council prevailed but the disagreement delayed the Austrian preparations by a month. The Austrian plan called for the I Corps under Heinrich Graf von Bellegarde, consisting of 38,000 troops, and the II Corps of 20,000 troops under Johann Kollowrat, to attack Regensburg (Ratisbon) from the Bohemian mountains by way of Cham. The Austrian center and reserve, comprising 66,000 men of Hohenzollern's III Corps, Rosenberg's IV Corps, and Lichtenstein's I Reserve Corps, would advance on the same objective through Scharding. The left wing, made up of the V Corps of Archduke Louis, Hiller's VI Corps, and Kienmayer's II Reserve Corps, a total of 61,000 men, would move toward Landshut and guard the army's flank. Two other theatres would be opened in Poland and Italy. Historian Steven Englund considers that Austria "might well have won the campaign" if the nation had focused on Germany.

French preparations
The French army mostly consisted of veterans of Napoleon's earlier campaigns, though recent conscripts formed large parts of some units, negatively affecting their fighting ability.  The army was enthusiastic and keen to fight well under Napoleon's direct leadership. Napoleon was not certain about Austrian planning and intentions.  He returned to Paris from his campaigns in Spain in winter 1808–09 and instructed the main French field commander in southern Germany, Louis Alexandre Berthier, on planned deployments and concentrations for this likely new second front. His rough ideas about the possible upcoming campaign included the decision to make the Danube valley the main theatre of operations, as he had done in 1805, and to stop Austrian forces that might invade northern Italy by positioning some of his own forces under the command of Eugène de Beauharnais and Auguste Marmont. Faulty intelligence gave Napoleon the impression that the main Austrian attack would come north of the Danube. On 30 March, he wrote a letter to Berthier explaining his intention to mass 140,000 troops in the vicinity of Regensburg (Ratisbon), far to the north of where the Austrians were planning to make their attack.  It was expected that this redeployment would take until mid-April to accomplish and Napoleon instructed Berthier that if the attack came before 15 April he was to fall back towards the Lech.

Austria–Bavaria front

Austria strikes first

The first indication of an Austrian attack was a formal note sent by Archduke Charles to French Marsal François Joseph Lefebvre on 9 April.  It stated that Charles had orders from Francis to invade Bavaria, a French client state under Maximilian I.  In the early morning of 10 April, leading elements of the Austrian army crossed the Inn River into Bavaria; there was no formal declaration of war. Bad roads and freezing rain slowed the Austrian advance in the first week, but the opposing Bavarian forces of Lefebvre's corps gradually retreated.  Davout's III Corps withdrew westerwards towards Ingolstadt, anticipating orders to concentrate with other French forces.  The Austrian attack had occurred about a week before Napoleon anticipated, disrupting French plans.  Napoleon ordered that an Austrian attack before 15 April should be met by a general French concentration around Donauwörth and Augsburg in the west, but his orders arrived fragmented and out of sequence and were poorly interpreted by Berthier who was more accustomed to staff duties than field command.  Berthier focussed on an ambiguous sentence that called for Davout to station his III Corps around Regensburg "whatever happens"; it is likely that Napoleon intended this to apply only if the Austrians attacked after 15 April.  On 14 April Berthier ordered Davout's corps, together with those of Lefebvre and Oudinot, to march to Regensburg which Davout had recently vacated. 

On the same day the Austrian advance guard had beaten the Bavarians near Landshut and secured a good crossing place over the Isar by evening. Charles planned to destroy Davout's and Lefebvre's isolated corps in a double-pincer manoeuvre. Napoleon arrived in Donauwörth on 17 April and took command from Berthier. When Napoleon realised that many of the Austrian forces had crossed the Isar and were marching towards the Danube, he insisted that the entire French army deploy behind the Ilm River in a bataillon carré in 48 hours. His orders were unrealistic because he underestimated the number of Austrian troops that were heading for Davout; Napoleon believed Charles only had a single corps over the Isar, but the Austrians had five corps moving towards Regensburg, totalling 80,000 men.

Landshut Maneuver

Davout anticipated facing overwhelming forces and withdrew most of his forces, leaving 2,000 men from Regensburg. The northbound Austrian columns in the Kelheim–Abbach zone encountered four columns of Davout's men heading west towards Neustadt in the early hours of 19 April. The Austrian attacks were slow, uncoordinated, and easily repulsed by the experienced French III Corps. Napoleon knew there was fighting in Davout's sector and devised a new strategy to defeat the Austrians: while the Austrians attacked to the north, André Masséna's corps, augmented by Oudinot's forces, would strike southeast towards Freising and Landshut in hopes of threatening the Austrian flank and relieving the pressure on Davout. Napoleon intended the corps of Davout and Lefebvre to pin the Austrians while his other forces swept into the Austrian rear.

The central Austrian V Corps were defeated in the Battle of Abensberg, allowing the French to advance. Napoleon was working under false assumptions that made his goals difficult to achieve. Massena's advance to Landshut required too much time, permitting Hiller to escape south over the Isar. The Danube bridge, which provided easy access to Regensburg, and the east bank had not been demolished. This allowed Austrians to cross the river and stopped France from destroying the forces. On 20 April, the Austrians had suffered 10,000 casualties, lost 30 guns, 600 caissons, and 7,000 other vehicles, but were still a potent fighting force. With the main French army near Landshut, if Charles had attacked Davout he could have destroyed his corps and fallen on the rear of Napoleon's force.  He retained the bridge at Regensburg and the road to Straubing and Vienna as an avenue of retreat.

On 21 April, Napoleon received a dispatch from Davout that spoke of the Battle of Teugen-Hausen. Davout held his ground; although Napoleon sent reinforcements, about 36,000 French troops had to fight 75,000 Austrians. When Napoleon learned that Charles was not withdrawing to the east, he realigned the Armée d'Allemagnes axis in an operation later called the Landshut Maneuver. All of the French forces, except 20,000 troops under Jean-Baptiste Bessières that were chasing Hiller, attacked Eckmühl to trap the Austrians and relieve their beleaguered comrades. On 22 April, Charles left 40,000 troops under Rosenburg and Hohenzollern to attack Davout and Lefebvre while detaching two corps under Kollowrat and Lichtenstein to march for Abbach and gain undisputed control of the river bank. Napoleon arrived at 1:30 pm while the battle continued. Davout ordered an attack along the entire line despite numerical inferiority; the 10th Light Infantry Regiment successfully stormed the village of Leuchling and captured the woods of Unter-Leuchling with heavy casualties.  Recognising the threat posed by Napoleon's forces on his left flank, Charles ordered a withdrawal towards Regensburg, granting the field to France.

Napoleon sent Massena to occupy Straubing as he thought the Austrians might retreat along that route.  Charles moved his men across the Danube at Regensburg, leaving 6,000 in the fortress to block a pursuit.  Lacking time for a siege, Napoleon ordered Marshal Jean Lannes to storm the walls, succeeding at his second attempt and capturing the town by 5 pm in the Battle of Ratisbon.  With the Austrian army safely in Bohemia, Napoleon marched towards Vienna.  Hiller fought a series of delaying actions, attempting to buy time for the defence of Vienna.  After a short fight at Wels on 2 May, Hiller gathered 40,000 troops at the bridge in Ebersberg.  Massena launched a costly frontal at the Battle of Ebersberg and captured the position on 3 May, with Hiller withdrawing along the Danube.  Charles attempted to move his army to defend Vienna but was outpaced by Napoleon who captured the city on 13 May. The garrison withdrew north of the Danube and destroyed the bridges behind them.

Aspern-Essling

On 16 May and 17, the main Austrian army under Charles arrived in the Marchfeld, a plain northeast of Vienna just across the Danube that served as a training ground for Austrian military forces. Charles kept most of his forces several miles away from the riverbank, hoping to concentrate them at the point where Napoleon decided to cross. On the 20th, Charles learned from his observers on the Bissam hill that the French were building a bridge at Kaiser-Ebersdorf, just southwest of the Lobau island, that led to the Marchfeld. On 21 May, Charles concluded that the French were crossing at Kaiser-Ebersdorf and ordered a general advance for 98,000 troops and the accompanying 292 guns, organized into five columns. The French bridgehead rested on two villages: Aspern to the west and Essling to the east. Napoleon did not expect to encounter opposition, and the bridges linking the French troops at Aspern-Essling to Lobau were not protected with palisades, making them vulnerable to Austrian barges that had been set ablaze.

The Battle of Aspern-Essling started at 2:30 pm on 21 May. The initial attacks were made by the first three columns on Aspern and the Gemeinde Au woods but were poorly coordinated and failed.  Later assaults succeeded in taking and holding the western portion of the village. The Austrians did not attack Essling until 6 pm because the fourth and fifth columns had longer marching routes. The French successfully repulsed the attacks against Essling throughout the day. Fighting commenced by 3 am on 22 May, and four hours later the French had captured Aspern again. Napoleon had 71,000 men and 152 guns on the other side of the river, but the French were still outnumbered. Napoleon launched a massive assault against the Austrian center designed to give enough time for the III Corps to cross and secure a victory. Lannes advanced with three infantry divisions and travelled for a mile before the Austrians, inspired by the personal presence of Charles who rallied the Zach Infantry Regiment, opened a heavy fire on the French that caused the latter to fall back. At 9 am, the French bridge broke again. Charles launched another massive assault an hour later and captured Aspern for the final time, but struggled to capture Essling. A few hours later, the Austrians returned and took all of Essling except the staunchly defended granary. Napoleon ordered the Imperial Guard under Jean Rapp, to support a withdrawal from the granary.  Rapp disobeyed his orders and led a bayonet charge that drove the Austrians from Essling, for which he was later commended by Napoleon. Napoleon realised his bridgehead was untenable and ordered a withdrawal, giving command to Lannes.  Lannes was struck by a cannonball and mortally wounded.  The French withdrew to Lobau by nightfall, burning their pontoons bridge in behind them.  Charles had inflicted the first major defeat in Napoleon's military career and caused the first fatality among his marshals, but his exhausted army could not pursue the French.

Wagram

After the defeat at Aspern-Essling, Napoleon took more than six weeks to plan and prepare contingencies before making another attempt at crossing the Danube. The French brought more troops, more guns, and instituted better defensive measures to ensure the success of the next crossing. From 30 June to the early days of July, the French recrossed the Danube, with more than 188,000 troops marching across the Marchfeld towards the Austrians. Immediate resistance to the French advance was restricted to the outpost divisions of Nordmann and Johann von Klenau; the main Habsburg army was stationed five miles (8 km) away, centered on the village of Wagram.  Napoleon ordered a general advance at noon on 5 July; an early attack by Massena on the left flank captured Leopold and Süssenbrunn but the French were held off elsewhere by a strong Austrian defence.

For 6 July, Charles planned a double-envelopment that required a quick march from the forces of his brother John, who was a few kilometers east of the battlefield. Napoleon's plan envisaged an envelopment of the Austrian left with Davout's III Corps while the rest of the army pinned the Austrian forces. Klenau's VI Corps, supported by Kollowrat's III Corps, started the battle on the second day at 4 am with a crushing assault against the French left, forcing the latter to abandon both Aspern and Essling. Meanwhile, Bernadotte had unilaterally ordered his troops out of the central village of Aderklaa, citing heavy artillery shelling, and compromised the French position. Napoleon was livid and sent two divisions of Massena's corps supported by cavalry to regain the critical village. After difficult fighting in the first phase, Massena sent in Molitor's reserve division, which slowly captured Aderklaa back for the French, only to lose it again following fierce Austrian bombardments and counterattacks. To delay the Austrian army for Davout's materializing assault, Napoleon sent 4,000 cuirassiers under Nansouty against the Austrian lines.  To dissuade the Austrians from attacking, Napoleon formed a 112-gun grand battery in the center of his lines. As Davout's men were progressing against the Austrian left, Napoleon formed the three small divisions of MacDonald into a hollow, oblong shape that marched against the Austrian center. The lumbering phalanx was devastated by Austrian artillery but managed to break through the Austrian forces.  With the Austrians at Wagram weakened by the need to reinforce their left against Davout, Oudinot was able to capture the village and split the Austrian army.  Upon learning that his brother's forces would not arrive until the evening, Charles ordered a withdrawal at 2.30 pm.  The Austrians withdrew in good order, the main army westwards and the left-wing to the north.

The French suffered heavy losses, around 32,000 men, with their commanders particularly affected as around 40 French generals were killed and wounded; Austrian losses stood at around 35,000.  Fighting was renewed at Znaim on 10–11 July. On 12 July, Charles signed the Armistice of Znaim, which led to lengthy peace negotiations between Napoleon and Metternich.

Other theatres

Italian front 
In Italy, Archduke John battled Napoleon's stepson Eugène. The Austrians defended against several bungled French assaults at the Battle of Sacile in April, causing Eugène to fall back on Verona and the Adige River.   Eugène was able to concentrate his forces while John detached troops to support Charles.  John won victory at the 30 April Battle of Caldiero but was forced to retreat due to Eugène's increasing superiority and the movements on the Austria-Bavaria front.  John was defeated in the 8 May Battle of Piave River and forced out of Italy. Eugène detached MacDonald to pursue John and joined Napoleon at Vienna with the rest of his army. 

In the Dalmatian Campaign, Marmont, under the nominal command of Eugène, was fighting against an Austrian invasion led by General Stoichewich. Marmont launched a counteroffensive in the mountains on 30 April, but this was repulsed by the Grenzer troops.  Further attacks in May led to a series of victories against a dispersed Austrian force.  By the end of the month Marmont was able to march with the bulk of his troops to join the emperor at Vienna.

Failed British feint operation 

In July 1809 the British launched the Walcheren Campaign in the Netherlands to relieve the pressure on the Austrians and to weaken French naval power. The plan was to land a force at Walcheren and  advance along the Western Scheldt to the harbour of Antwerp, a French naval base.  The Royal Navy's patrols into the Western Scheldt and a dockyard strike at Antwerp alerted the French to the area's vulnerability and efforts were made to improve the defences and reinforce its garrisons. John Pitt, 2nd Earl of Chatham's force of over 39,000, a larger army than that serving in the Iberian Peninsula and the largest British Expeditionary Force of the Napoleonic Wars, landed at Walcheren on 30 July. The expedition was not capable of landing sufficient troops on the southern side of the Western Scheldt to capture the reinforced garrison at Cadzand due to a lack of boats.  An advance on Antwerp depended on the capture of Flushing on the northern shore to allow the passage of Royal Navy vessels up the Western Scheldt.  It took until 13 August for siege batteries to be set up and Flushing did not surrender until 16 August.  The British forces had meanwhile been suffering from "Walcheren Fever", thought to be a combination of Malaria and Typhus, and lost 4,000 men to the disease during the campaign.  By comparison only 106 men were killed in action.  By 24 August Chatham had decided that the fever had reduced his force too much and the defences of Antwerp were too strong to assault. The campaign ended without the British achieving their main objective of weakening France's naval power.  The first British troops were withdrawn on 7 September, though a disease-ravaged garrison was maintained until 9 December.  The failure of the campaign led to the resignation of the British prime minister, the Duke of Portland, and his replacement by Spencer Perceval.

Austro-Polish War 

Austria invaded the Duchy of Warsaw with initial success.  Poniatowski's army lost to the Austrians at the Battle of Raszyn on 19 April and Warsaw was occupied four days later, with the occupation lasting until 1 June. The Poles went on to invade Galicia, with some success, but the offensive quickly stalled with heavy casualties. The Austrians also won a few battles but were hampered by Russian troops whose intentions were unclear and did not allow them to advance. 

After the Austrian invasion of the Duchy of Warsaw, Russia reluctantly entered the war against Austria to fulfil their treaty of alliance with France. The Russian army, under the command of General Sergei Golitsyn, crossed into Galicia on 3 June 1809. Golitsyn advanced as slowly as possible, with instructions to avoid any major confrontation with the Austrians. There were minor skirmishes between the Russian and Austrian troops, with minimal losses. The Austrian and Russian commanders were in frequent correspondence and shared some operational intelligence. A courteous letter sent by a Russian divisional commander, General Andrey Gorchakov, to Archduke Ferdinand was intercepted by the Poles, who sent an original to Emperor Napoleon and a copy to Tsar Alexander, resulting in Gorchakov's removal from command by Alexander. There were constant disagreements between Golitsyn and Poniatowski, with whom the Russians were supposed to cooperate in Galicia. As a result of the Treaty of Schönbrunn, Russia received the Galician district of Tarnopol.

The war at sea 

Since the Napoleonic Wars started, British fleets launched numerous attacks on French fleets, ports, or colonies and British and French navies continued their fighting in 1809. Britain overwhelmed France in the Atlantic after the French defeat at Trafalgar Campaign and Atlantic campaign of 1806, and remnants of French fleet was stationed at bases in Bay of Biscay. French colonies on the Caribbean and the Atlantic provided shelters and could be major threats to the British fleet.  The French Atlantic Fleet was blockaded in Brest by a British force under James Gambier but the French were keen to intervene in the Caribbean following the British invasion of Martinique in January 1809.  A storm in February scattered Gambier's fleet and allowed the French, under Jean-Baptiste Philibert Willaumez, to put to sea and move to anchor in the Basque Roads.  On 23 February three French frigates attempting to join the main fleet were damaged in the Battle of Les Sables-d'Olonne.  A stalemate ensued with the French anchored under the guns of coastal batteries but blockaded by the British.  Willaumez was replaced by Zacharie Allemand on 16 March, who consolidated the anchorage defences. The British Admiralty sent Captain Lord Cochrane to lead an attack on the French.  Cochrane's 11 April assault with fireships caused panic in the French fleet and many vessels ran aground.  Gambier failed to capitalise on the situation by sending in the main British fleet, though Cochrane's smaller force destroyed a number of vessels over the following days.  The action confined the French fleet to its anchorage and allowed the British and Spanish to displace the French from Haiti that year and an invasion of Guadeloupe in early 1810.

Rebellions against French rule

Italian rebellions 
Archduke John issued proclamations in April 1809 calling on the population of Veneto to rise up against the French for the sake of Italian nationalism.  A portion of the population of Venice, including many criminals, rose up and took over public buildings, destroying taxation and conscription records.  The revolt continued after the withdrawal of Austrian forces in May, spreading to the rest of Veneto.  The rebels were inspired by the Tyrolean Rebellion.  The French garrison and militia were unable to contain the rebels and they were unplacated by the abolition of French taxes on flour, meat and wine.  Many towns in Veneto came under rebel control and rebels entered Emilia-Romagna where Bologna was threatened and Ferrara was sieged for ten days.  The rebellion ended in November 1809 and Napoleon reacted strongly: 4,000 troops were sent to Bologna from Naples and 675 citizens arrested, of whom 150 were killed.  In the mountains and marshes of the region, some rebels remained and acted as brigands until the end of French occupation.

Rebellion in Tyrol 

In Tyrol, Andreas Hofer led a rebellion against Bavarian rule and French domination that resulted in early isolated victories in the first Battles of Bergisel.  Hofer freed the Tyrol of Bavarian occupation by late August but on 29 September an Italian force under Luigi Gaspare Peyri captured Trento, though they could advance no further.  The next month, with troops made available after the Treaty of Schönbrunn, a Bavarian force under Jean-Baptiste Drouet, Comte d'Erlon travelled to end the rebellion.  Supported by Franco-Italian forces, a three-pronged attack occupied the region with 45,000 troops by early November.  Hofer went into hiding but was betrayed by one of his men in January 1810 and executed by the French.

Gottscheer rebellion 

One of the counties ceded to France was Gottschee (in modern-day Slovenia), which was to form part of the Illyrian Provinces.  The ethnic German population, the Gottscheers, led by Johann Erker, rebelled against the French garrison. Rebels were quickly defeated and the French intended to burn down the city of Gottschee.  After petitions from local clergy this was not carried out, but the city was looted for a period of three days from 16 October.

Black Brunswickers 
The Duchy of Brunswick had been incorporated in to the French client state of the Kingdom of Westphalia but its duke, Frederick William, sided with the Austrians in 1809.  His force of a few thousand volunteer Brunswickers fought alongside Austrian troops under General Kienmayer in Saxony, a French client state led by Frederick Augustus I.  They were successful, defeating a corps under the command of Junot at the Battle of Gefrees. After taking the Saxon capital, Dresden, and pushing back an army under the command of Napoleon's brother, Jérôme Bonaparte, the Austrians were effectively in control of all of Saxony. By this time, the main Austrian force had already been defeated at Wagram and the armistice of Znaim had been agreed. The Duke of Brunswick refused to be bound by the armistice and led his corps on a fighting march right across Germany to the mouth of the River Weser, from where they sailed to England and entered British service.

Aftermath 
After the main Austrian force was defeated at Wagram, the nation's forces collapsed, according to historian Charles Esdaile, and Emperor Francis was forced to sue for peace. Englund attributes the end to "diplomatic considerations" and believes that Austria could have continued to fight. The Treaty of Schönbrunn, signed on 14 October 1809, imposed a heavy political toll on the Austrians. Metternich and Charles succeeded in negotiating lighter terms in return for Austrian co-operation and most of the hereditary Habsburg territories were preserved. The lands given to the French were significant and included  Carinthia, Carniola, and the Adriatic ports, removing Austria's access to the Mediterranean. West Galicia was given to the Duchy of Warsaw. The lands of the short-lived Duchy of Salzburg, acquired by Austria as territorial compensation for losses on the Adriatic Coast and the loss of Tyrol in the Peace of Pressburg, were transferred to Bavaria. Russia was ceded the district of Tarnopol. Austria lost over three million subjects, about 20% of the kingdom's total population. Emperor Francis agreed to pay an indemnity equivalent to almost 85 million francs, gave recognition to Napoleon's brother Joseph as the King of Spain, and reaffirmed the exclusion of British trade from his remaining dominions.  After the Austrian defeat, Napoleon married the daughter of Emperor Francis, Marie Louise.  Napoleon hoped the marriage would cement a Franco-Austrian alliance and provide legitimacy to his regime.  The alliance gave Austria respite from war with France, which it had pursued on and off for ten years, and restored her status as a great European power; marital ties did not prevent Francis from declaring war on France in 1813.

The impact of the conflict was not all positive from the French perspective. The revolts in Tyrol and the Kingdom of Westphalia during the conflict were an indication that there was discontent over French rule among the German population. Just a few days before the conclusion of the Treaty of Schönbrunn, an 18-year-old German named Friedrich Staps approached Napoleon during an army review and attempted to stab the emperor, but he was intercepted by General Rapp. The emerging forces of German nationalism were strongly rooted by this time, and the War of the Fifth Coalition nurtured their development. In 1813, during the War of the Sixth Coalition, there were anti-French risings and spontaneous guerrilla activity, though whether this was fuelled by pan-German nationalism or patriotism for the old order is debated by historians; a united Germany did not come about until 1871.

The war undermined French military superiority and the Napoleonic image. The Battle of Aspern-Essling was the first major defeat in Napoleon's career and was warmly greeted by much of Europe. The Austrians had shown that strategic insight and tactical ability were no longer a French monopoly. The decline in the tactical skill of the French infantry led to increasingly heavy columns of foot soldiers eschewing manoeuvres and relying on sheer weight of numbers to break through, a development best emphasized by MacDonald's attack at Wagram. The Armée d'Allemagne did not have the qualitative edge of the Grande Armée partly because raw conscripts replaced many of the veterans of Austerlitz and Jena, eroding tactical flexibility. Napoleon's armies were increasingly composed of non-French contingents, undermining morale. Although Napoleon's manoeuvers were successful, as evidenced by overturning the awful initial French position, the growing size of his armies made military strategies more difficult to manage. The scale of warfare grew too large for Napoleon to fully manage, which became evident during the next Napoleonic war, the French invasion of Russia in 1812.

Englund describes the war as "the first modern war" for the use of "symmetrical conscript armies of singularly large size," that were divided into corps and commanded decentralized in theatres. He concludes that "it was a war of magnitude and maneuver more than before and the decisive factor was attrition more than dramatic one-(or two-)day pitched battles."

Notes

References

Bibliography

Further reading

 
 
 
 
 

19th-century conflicts
Conflicts in 1809
Coalition, 5th
1809 in Europe
Coalition Wars
Francis II, Holy Roman Emperor